Lepena is a dispersed settlement in the Municipality of Bovec in the Littoral region of Slovenia. It lies in the valley of Lepenjica Creek, a tributary of the Soča River. The Klement Jug Lodge at the end of the valley is a popular starting point with hikers for trips to the surrounding peaks in the Julian Alps.

References

External links

Lepena at Geopedia

Populated places in the Municipality of Bovec